Pre-Germanic may refer to
the predecessor of Common Germanic, see Germanic parent language
a language spoken before the arrival of Germanic speakers during the Migration period, see 
Germanic substrate hypothesis
Pre-Indo-European (disambiguation)